The Roger Miller Show is an American music variety television show hosted by Roger Miller.  The NBC program aired on Monday nights from 8:30–9 p.m. ET from September 12–December 26, 1966. The house band was the Eddie Karam Orchestra.

Notes

References
 .

External links
 Internet Movie Database

1960s American music television series
NBC original programming
1966 American television series debuts
1966 American television series endings
English-language television shows